Pontellidae is a family of copepods in the order Calanoida, containing the following genera:
Anomalocera Templeton, 1837
Calanopia Dana, 1852
Epilabidocera C. B. Wilson, 1932
Isocope Brady, 1915
Ivellopsis Claus, 1893
Labidocera Lubbock, 1853
Pontella Dana, 1846
Pontellina Dana, 1852
Pontellopsis Brady, 1883

References

External links

Calanoida
Crustacean families